Martin Hurka  (born 20 April 1993) is a Czech football player who currently plays for Motorlet Prague, as a striker.

Career 
Hurka began his career with SK Slavia Prague on youth side, he played than his first game in the Gambrinus liga on 25 April 2010 against Sigma Olomouc.

International career 
Hurka had passages in U17 and U18 levels, and was in the national squad for the 2010 UEFA European Under-17 Football Championship.

References

External links
 Profile at Slavia.cz 
 

1993 births
Footballers from Prague
Living people
Czech footballers
Association football forwards
Czech Republic youth international footballers
SK Slavia Prague players
SK Dynamo České Budějovice players
FK Kolín players
FK Viktoria Žižkov players
SK Benešov players
Czech First League players
Czech National Football League players